KMGR (99.1 FM) is a radio station licensed to Nephi, Utah, United States. The station is broadcasting both easy listening and soft adult contemporary formats, and is an affiliate of ABC News Radio. It serves the Provo-Orem metropolitan area. The station is currently owned by Sanpete County Broadcasting Company.

The station has a construction permit to increase ERP to 100,000 watts, changing class type to C1; its present license is Class A. This would provide the station with coverage into Provo, Utah and parts of the southern Salt Lake valley.

References

External links

MGR
Radio stations established in 1994
1994 establishments in Utah
Soft adult contemporary radio stations in the United States
Easy listening radio stations